As a significant Great Lakes port there has been a need for fireboats in Milwaukee.

References

Milwaukee
Firefighting in Wisconsin
Government of Milwaukee
Water transportation in Wisconsin